Delphus Kill is a river that flows into the Mohawk River in Dunsbach Ferry, New York.

References 

Rivers of New York (state)
Rivers of Albany County, New York
Mohawk River